KRQU (98.7 FM, 98.7 Vintage Vinyl) is an American radio station licensed to Laramie, Wyoming, United States. The station serves the Laramie area.  The station is currently owned by Appaloosa Broadcasting Company, Inc.

History
Prior to switching frequencies, KRQU was located at 104.5 FM.  The station was assigned the call sign KHIH on May 2, 2005.  On December 29, 2005, the station changed its call sign to KUSZ, and on March 5, 2008, to KRQU. On April 6, 2011, changed its call sign to KAAZ. On November 26, 2012, changed its call sign to the current KRQU.

References

External links

Oldies radio stations in the United States
RQU
Albany County, Wyoming
Radio stations established in 2006
2006 establishments in Wyoming